Hole in the Ground may refer to:

 "The Hole in the Ground", a 1962 comic song by Bernard Cribbins
 Hole-in-the-Ground, a crater in Lake County, Oregon, U.S.
 The Hole in the Ground (film), a 2019 horror film produced in Ireland, Belgium and Finland
 A sinkhole

See also
" From a Hole in the Ground", a song from The Sword of God (album) (2001) by Quasi